Andrew Underhill (April 17, 1749 - before June 14, 1794) was an American silversmith, active in New York City.

Underhill was born in Cedar Swamp, New York, or Westbury, Long Island, a brother of silversmith Thomas Underhill. He married Deborah Willett on November 3, 1774, in Matinecock, New York, and worked from 1775-1788 as a silversmith in New York City. On his death, his will records property in Vendewater Street and farms and mills at New Rochelle. His works are collected in the Art Institute of Chicago, Metropolitan Museum of Art, Museum of the City of New York, and Winterthur Museum.

References 
 "Andrew Underhill", American Silversmiths.
 "Andrew Underhill", Online Encyclopedia of Silver Marks, Hall Marks, and Makers' Marks.
 "An American silver tankard, Andrew Underhill, New York, circa 1775", Sotheby's.
 American Silver in the Art Institute of Chicago, Art Institute of Chicago, Yale University Press, 2016, page 103.

American silversmiths
1749 births
Year of death missing